Dyle may refer to:

Dyle (river),  is a river in central Belgium, a tributary of the Rupel
Dyle, Poland
Dyle Plan
Dyle (department)
ATSC-M/H mobile TV service brand on U.S. TV stations